"Orphans" is a song by American alternative rock musician Beck. It is the opening track on his eleventh studio album Modern Guilt. It is one of two songs off the album to feature Cat Power on backing vocals, whom they recorded the song with for only 45 minutes. The song is also unique for being one of the only times Beck ever played the flute in a song. It was the very first song recorded with famous producer Danger Mouse, which was recorded on the first day they teamed up. Beck has gone on to say that Danger Mouse originally only planned to record this song with him. In an interview on the BBC Radio 6 Music radio station he had stated that:"We were already friends, so I called him and said, ''Let's do a record'. But he said, 'Well, I don't have time so we'll do one song.' We did the first song on the album ('Orphans') and then decided that there was a whole record there. A couple of months later - we had a whole record." Since 2008, Beck has played this song 29 times though has not played the song live since 2009. In 2005 or 2006, Beck had done an interview where he was asked on what occasions he cries, He responded saying:"No, I cried watching this documentary about these Sudanese orphans who get shipped off to America and they don't have parents and one guy talked about how he hadn't seen his parents since he was a little boy. Maybe it's being a father, but that definitely hit me." Later in a separate interview he has stated that was an inspiration for the song, though the song is not specifically about Sudan but rather the disconnection and dislocation felt by "orphans".

Music video 
The music video features Beck playing the song with two other unspecified musicians over a white background in black and white. The music video can only be found on YouTube and iTunes. It is unknown who directed the music video or when it was first released.

Personnel 
 Beck Hansen – vocals, guitar, flute, percussion
 Brian LeBarton – synthesizer
 Jason Falkner – bass guitar
 Cat Power – vocals
 Danger Mouse – beats

Charts

References 

2008 songs
Beck songs
DGC Records singles
Song recordings produced by Danger Mouse (musician)
XL Recordings singles